Phoenixville is a borough in Chester County, Pennsylvania, United States. It is in the Philadelphia metropolitan area. According to a 2021 estimate, the population was 19,029. As noted by Forbes, Phoenixville is a former beaten-down mill town with a recent downtown revitalization plan that led to 10 craft breweries, a distillery, and winery tasting rooms.

History 

Originally called Manavon, Phoenixville was settled in 1732 and incorporated as a borough in 1849. In its industrial heyday early in the twentieth century, it was an important manufacturing center and the site of great iron and steel mills such as the Phoenix Iron Works, boiler works, silk mill, underwear and hosiery factories, a match factory, and the famous (and now highly collectible) Etruscan majolica pottery. Like many American towns and cities, Phoenixville owes its growth to its waterways. It is not only on the broad Schuylkill River, a historic thoroughfare to Native Americans and early settlers, it is also bisected by the fast-flowing French Creek, which was quickly harnessed for water power.

Much of this history was recognized by the creation of the Phoenixville Historic District, the largest National Register of Historic Places site in Chester County. The Black Rock Bridge, Gay Street School, and Schuylkill Navigation Canal, Oakes Reach Section are also listed on the National Register of Historic Places.

The Phoenixville Historical Society has a rotating display of historical artifacts in its museum.

Etymology
The first nail factory in the U.S., the French Creek Nail Works, was established in Phoenixville (then called Manavon) in 1790. In 1813, a bridge builder, Lewis Wernwag, became part owner and renamed it the Phoenix Iron Works. In 1840, new owners added a blast furnace. In 1855, a new group of owners incorporated as the Phoenix Iron Co. When the borough was incorporated in 1849, it incorporated the name of its major employer.
After several ownership changes, the plant was shut down in 1949 and later acquired by the Barium Steel Corp. and renamed the Phoenix Iron & Steel Company, later The Phoenix Steel Corporation. The entire plant was shut down for the last time in 1987.

Attractions
 In March 2010, Philadelphia magazine listed Phoenixville as one of "10 Awesome Neighborhoods To Call Home".
 Phoenixville is home to the Colonial Theatre, opened in 1903. In 1958, the theatre, along with some other parts of the borough, was featured in the motion picture The Blob. Since 2000, Phoenixville has celebrated this with the annual Blobfest. Festivities include a reenactment of the scene featuring the Colonial. The Colonial runs special programs some weekends in July, and an ongoing series of movies and events for children. A major expansion project incorporating the neighboring historic bank property, started construction in 2016 and was finished in early summer of 2017.
In 2018, Phoenixville was named #10 in the nation for most breweries per capita.
In February 2021, TravelMag listed Phoenixville as one of "The Most Charming Towns and Small Cities in Pennsylvania".
 Also since 2004, Phoenixville has celebrated the "rebirth" of the town with the burning of a large wooden phoenix. The bonfire at the Firebird Festival is used to harden clay birds crafted over the preceding weeks.
 Phoenixville is in close proximity to Valley Forge National Historical Park and the Perkiomen and Schuylkill River trails.
A Whole Lot of LuLu, a twice-annual vintage and handmade market, is held here.

Economy

Phoenixville has a diverse local economy that largely includes many local artisans and restaurants. Among the local hotspots are Steel City and the Colonial Theater, two establishments that survived both the economic downturn and Phoenixville's recent revitalization.

While the plans for an economic revitalization began back in 2001, it was not until 2009 that first brewpub opened in Phoenixville. That brewpub was Iron Hill Brewery. Molly Maguire's Pub, both located on Bridge Street. Customers Bank, the nation's fourth-best community bank for return on equity in 2011, according to the American Bankers Association, is headquartered in downtown Phoenixville.

One impact of economic revitalization has been the increase in the cost for residents living in Phoenixville which was partially the result of increased demand for housing caused by the growth of local restaurants, breweries and boutiques in town. Community leaders, the Phoenixville Borough Council, along with two consecutive mayors, saw the need to create an Affordable Housing Task Force to study what personal financial issues existed in the community, as well as to propose solutions to any housing issues they uncovered.

That task force later became the Affordable Housing Council of Phoenixville. The Council's website states: "In Chester County, we recognized that the community was changing and Phoenixville needed to keep pace with the evolving demographics of its wonderful town. Our community saw an increase in homelessness as well as limited housing options for families and seniors/individuals with a limited income. Several of the local community leaders took it upon themselves to research the issue and gained the support from the Borough of Phoenixville to create a task force. The focus of the task force is to create affordable housing options for families and seniors/individuals with a fixed income."

In 2017, several community leaders and residents voiced support for the approval of Steel Town Village which was an affordable housing community, as well as the general need for affordable housing throughout the borough. Some opposed the project, but Borough Council approved the project.

Geography and climate
 Phoenixville is located at  (40.130819, -75.519061).
Phoenixville is home of the highest recorded temperature in Pennsylvania, set on July 10, 1936.
 Average annual rainfall: 46"
 Average annual snowfall: 21"
 Average temperature in winter: 34 °F
 Average temperature in summer: 73 °F
The record high in Pennsylvania was recorded in Phoenixville, on July 9–10, 1936, at 111°F. 

 Köppen climate classification: Dfa (hot-summer humid continental) immediately bordering upon Cfa (humid subtropical)
 Hardiness zone: 6b/7a depending upon elevation

Adjacent municipalities
East Pikeland Township, Chester County, Pennsylvania – West
Schuylkill Township, Chester County, Pennsylvania – South and East
Upper Providence Township, Montgomery County, Pennsylvania – North

Transportation

Phoenixville is served by three state highways: Pennsylvania Route 23, Pennsylvania Route 29, and Pennsylvania Route 113.  PA 23 follows a northwest-to-southeast alingment through western and southern sections of the borough via Nutt Road. PA 29 follows a southwest-to-northeast alignment through southern and eastern sections of the borough via Main Street, Manavon Street, Starr Street and Bridge Street. Finally, PA 113 follows a similar alignment through western and northern parts of the borough via Kimberton Road, Nutt Road, Bridge Street, Franklin Avenue, Emmett Street, Dayton Street, Franklin Street and Black Rock Road. PA 23 and PA 113 share a short concurrency in the western portion of the borough.

Phoenixville is currently served by SEPTA's Route 99 bus, which connects with the Manayunk/Norristown Line Regional rail service at the Norristown Transportation Center, and the Route 139 bus, which connects the King of Prussia mall with Limerick.

Several major railroads once served Phoenixville. The main line of the Reading Company entered the east side of town via a station above Bridge Street. The line passes under the north side of town in the Black Rock Tunnel, the third railroad tunnel constructed in the United States.  Regular commuter trains last stopped at the Phoenixville Station in 1981, when SEPTA ceased operating non-electrified commuter lines. Norfolk Southern Railway (NS) currently utilizes the busy line on a daily basis as part of its Harrisburg Line.  Phoenixville was also the place where the Pickering Valley Railroad joined the Reading.  The Pickering Valley was operated as a subsidiary of the Reading until 1906, when it was merged into the Reading, and became the Pickering Valley Branch of that railroad.  The branch was closed in the late 20th century, and most of the track has been removed.

The Pennsylvania Railroad (PRR) Schuylkill Branch also served Phoenixville.  The line enters town crossing the Schuylkill River from neighboring Mont Clare on a high bridge, north of French Creek.  The line passes along the north side of the former Phoenix Iron Works site. The station on Vanderslice Street, west of Gay Street, no longer exists.  Past the Works, the line splits.  The main fork passed through the now abandoned Phoenixville Tunnel, which partially collapsed in the 1990s, and continued toward Reading.  The other fork continued along the Pickering Creek Valley and used to connect with the Main Line at Paoli.  A section of the line remains in place, and is currently known as the Phoenixville Industrial track (also owned by NS).  Passenger service ended in 1928 and regular freight service on the line ceased in 2004.  During the 2008 replacement of the Gay Street Bridge, the line was severed at its crossing of Main Street and that rail bridge raised a few feet to allow emergency vehicles to reach the north side of town.

Interest to resume passenger rail service was spurred by the Schuylkill Valley Metro (SVM) project, which was rejected by Federal Transit Administration in 2006. Another project, called the Greenline, has since been proposed an alternative to the SVM.  It would utilize the Phoenixville Industrial track, to give Phoenixville a rail link to Philadelphia via Paoli and the Paoli/Thorndale Line of regional rail.  The effort to resume passenger train service has led to the creation of the group Citizens for the Train.

Governance

Phoenixville is governed by a mayor and by eight council members, two for each of four wards: Middle, East, North, and West.  Each ward is further divided into three numbered election precincts. The precincts do not have government representatives.

Borough Council meets on the second Tuesday of every month. Police, Personnel, & Public Safety Committee meets 1st Monday at 6:30pm. Infrastructure Committee meets on the 3rd Tuesday at 7pm (Jan.-June) & 6pm (July-Dec.). Finance Committee meets 3rd Tuesday at 6pm (Jan.-June) & 7pm (July-Dec.). Parks and Recreation Committee meets 4th Tuesday at 6pm.  Policy Committee meets 4th Tuesday at 7pm.

The current Mayor of Phoenixville is Peter Urscheler.  The 2021 mayoral election results:  
           Peter Urscheler (Dem/Rep)   .  .     3,222   94.21%
           Write-In Totals .  .  .  .  .  .        99    2.89%
           Not Assigned .  .  .  .  .  .  .        99    2.89%

Borough Council members are: East Ward - Jeremy Dalton, and Cathy Doherty.  Middle Ward: Michael Kuznar (beginning January, 2018, Beth Burckley), and Jonathan Ewald.  North Ward: Edwin Soto, Christopher Bauers (beginning January, 2018, Rich Kirkner). West Ward: James C. Kovaleski - President. Dana Dugan - Vice-President.

Phoenixville is in Pennsylvania's 6th federal Congressional District (represented by Chrissy Houlahan), there are two districts in the Pennsylvania House of Representatives, the 157th State House of Representatives District (represented by Melissa Shusterman), the 155th State House of Representatives District (represented by Danielle Friel Otten), and in the state senate 19th State Senatorial District (represented by Andy Dinniman).

Education

Public school 
Phoenixville is served by the Phoenixville Area School District, which has three elementary schools, a middle school and a high school. High school students can choose to attend the Technical College High School Pickering Campus for specific hands-on training in particular fields of study. The School District also serves the surrounding municipalities of East Pikeland and Schuylkill Townships.

Private schools
 VFKH Montessori School
Holy Family School

Charter schools
 Phoenixville Renaissance Academy

Higher education
 Lansdale School of Business
 University of Valley Forge

Demographics

As of the census of 2010, there were 16,440 people, 7,590 households. There were 6,793 housing units at an average density of 1,892.6/sq mi (730.6/km²).

The racial makeup of the borough was 78.0% White, 8.6% African American, 0.2% American Indian, 3.5% Asian, 0.2% Pacific Islander, 2.6% two or more races, and Hispanic or Latino of any race were 7.4% of the population.

The Borough's age demographics were 6.3% under the age of 5, 79.9% (12,822) from 18 to 65, and 11.6% (1,870) from 65 and older. The median age was 37.90 years, 52.6% (8,448) are females, and 47.4% (7,606) are males. The median income for a household in the Borough was $56,704, and the median income for a family was $71,005.

Religion
Phoenixville is home to 34 designated places of worship of several different religions.

42.5% of residents are Catholic, 36.7% reported none, 12.2% Mainline Protestant, 6.3% Evangelical Protestant, 1.2% other, 0.9% Black Protestant, 0.1% Orthodox.

Notable people

Sports
Rick Allain, former ice hockey player and coach
Creighton Gubanich, former Major League Baseball player with the Boston Red Sox
Rich Kraynak, former linebacker for the Philadelphia Eagles
Rob Lohr, football player
Kevin Negandhi, ESPN analyst
Neal Olkewicz, football player
Mike Piazza, former Major League Baseball catcher and Baseball Hall of Fame member
John Smiley, MLB pitcher
André Thornton, former Major League Baseball player
Frank Zinn, baseball player

Entertainment
Kevin Bacon, actor from Philadelphia, spent weekends at his grandmother's home in Phoenixville
Terry Gilkyson, song composer, writer of "Memories Are Made of This", "Greenfields", "The Cry of the Wild Goose"
Jerry Spinelli, writer
Jack Wall, video game soundtrack composer
David White, actor
William George Wilson, sports cinematographer

Other
Everett W. Anderson, soldier who received Medal of Honor during the American Civil War
Raymond P. Coffman, USMC Major general, served with 1st Marine Division during World War II
James F. Crow, prominent population geneticist and Professor Emeritus at the University of Wisconsin
Elizabeth Wendell Ewing, Civil War nurse
Samuel W. Pennypacker, soldier, writer and 23rd Governor of Pennsylvania
Rebecca Lane Pennypacker Price, Civil War nurse, philanthropist
Nina Guzman, Founder of Alianzas de Phoenixville, advocate

References

External links

 Website of the Borough of Phoenixville
 
 

Populated places on the Schuylkill River
Populated places established in 1732
Boroughs in Chester County, Pennsylvania
1849 establishments in Pennsylvania